Phootprint is a proposed sample-return mission to the Mars moon Phobos by the European Space Agency (ESA), proposed to be launched in 2024.

Overview and status
The Phootprint mission is a candidate for the Mars Robotic Exploration Preparation Programme 2 (MREP-2) at ESA.  During 2014, ESA funded a pre-phase A feasibility study and industrial system studies of 8-month duration.  Currently, it is in phase A, meaning 'mission definition study.'

The mission is proposed to be launched on an Ariane 5 in 2024 with early 2026 as backup date. An Earth swingby would provide greater launcher margin.  The spacecraft would orbit Mars for the characterisation phase,  and when ready, it would maneuver into a quasi-satellite orbit to facilitate landing. Because of the low gravity, the lander would be anchored to the surface during sample collection and launch of the Earth Re-entry Capsule (ERC).

The mission would last about 3.5 years, including cruise, mapping orbit, 7 days on the surface, and sample return cruise time. The spacecraft would be powered by solar arrays.

In August 2015, the ESA-Roscosmos working group on post-ExoMars cooperation, completed a joint study for a possible future Phobos Sample Return mission, and preliminary discussions were held.

Objectives

The top-level science goal is to understand the formation of the Martian moons Phobos and Deimos and put constraints on the evolution of the Solar System (co-formation, capture, impact ejecta).

The mission objectives are:
Return 100 grams (g) of loose material from the surface of Phobos.
Access at least 50% of the Phobos surface for the sampling operations.
Landing site selected by Science Team during mission post extensive global and local mapping campaign 
Strict requirements on surface contamination
Goal of 800 g load on sample (return approximately )
Static landing with  landing accuracy

Mission engineers remark that "no rebound" after landing is a critical condition given the low-gravity environment of landing. Currently, engineers at ESA are leaning toward four cantilever-type landing legs with crushable aluminium honeycomb shock absorber and secondary load limiters.

Spacecraft
The concept of the Phootprint spacecraft is still preliminary and composed by three modules:

The Landing Module (LM) carrying the ERV & ERC, performing the transfer to Mars, the Mars orbit insertion and phasing manoeuvres to reach Phobos vicinity, the operations around and on Phobos, including landing and sampling. The landing Module would be equipped with a  sampling robotic arm.
The Earth Return Vehicle (ERV) performing the Mars escape, the transfer back to Earth and the ERC release few hours before re-entry.
The Earth Re-entry Capsule (ERC) — fully passive concept: ballistic re-entry, no parachute, hard landing on ground with maximum impact deceleration of 1700 g to the sample. A location beacon would be included within sample container.

Proposed payload
, the conceptual 30 kg (66.1 lb) payload is:

Wide angle camera
Narrow angle camera
Close-up camera
Context camera for sampling context
Visible-IR spectrometer
Infrared spectrometer
a radio science investigation

Mission architecture
The proposed mission architecture is:
Ariane 5 launch from Kourou in direct escape
Transfer to Mars (11 months)
Nine months orbiting Phobos/Mars dedicated to science observations and sampling (7 days on the surface)
Departure from Mars to Earth (8 months)

See also

References

European Space Agency space probes
Proposed space probes
Missions to Mars
Phobos (moon)
Sample return missions